This is a list of banks in Dominican Republic as of November 2010, published by the Bank Superintendency, including credit unions and other financial services companies that offer banking services and may be popularly referred to as "banks".

Central bank

Central Bank of the Dominican Republic

Local banks
The main local banks: Central Bank of the Dominican Republic, Banco Popular Dominicano, Banreservas and Banco BHD Leon contribute more than 60% market share.

Government-owned banks

BanReservas

Commercial banks

Banco Popular Dominicano
Banco BHD (Merged from Banco BHD and Banco Leon)
Banco Santa Cruz
Banco Caribe
Banco BDI
Banco Vimenca
Banco Lopez de Haro
Bancamérica

Foreign banks

Banesco
Scotiabank
Banco Promerica

Savings and credit banks

Banco Atlántico
Banco Bancotuí
Banco BDA
Banco Adopem
Banco Agrícola De La Republica Dominicana
Banco Pyme Bhd
Banco Ademi
Banco Capital
Banco Confisa
Banco De Desarrollo Idecosa
Banco Empire
Banco Motor Credito
Banco Río
Banco Providencial
Banco Del Caribe
Banco Inmobiliario (Banaci)
Banco Gruficorp
Banco Cofaci
Banco Atlas
Banco Bonanza
Banco Bellbank
Banco Fihogar
Banco Federal
Banco Micro
Banco Unión
Kneutt F.Bank

Savings and loan associations

Asociación Popular de Ahorros y Préstamos
Asociación Cibao
Asociación Nortena
Asociación Romana
Asociación Higuamo
Asociación La Vega Real
Asociación Duarte
Asociación Barahona
Asociación Maguana
Asociación Mocana
Asociación Bonao
Asociación La Nacional
Asociación Noroestana

Defunct or merged banks

Banco Intercontinental (BANINTER; fell in 2003)
Bancrédito (fell in 2003)
Banco Mercantil (fell in 2003)
Republic Bank  (local operations bought by Banco BHD in 2007)
Banco Altas Cumbres (local operations bought by Scotiabank in 2008)
Banco Peravia; Asociación Peravia (disestablished in 2014)

Automated teller machines
There are 2462 automated teller machine

Bank penetration in Dominican Republic
The bank penetration is approximately 33.7% and the main banks in DR are Banco Popular Dominicano, Banco de Reservas de la Republica Dominicana, Banco BHD.

External links
Bank Superintendency of the Dominican Republic (Superintendencia de Bancos de la República Dominicana)
Central Bank of the Dominican Republic (Banco Central de la República Dominicana)
Detailed List of all banks in the Dominican Republic  (Lista detallada de todos los bancos de la República Dominicana)

 
Banks
Dominican Republic
Economy of the Dominican Republic
Dominican Republic